The Grand-Rue in Argenteuil is an 1872 painting by Alfred Sisley, previously entitled A Street in Sèvres. It is now in Norwich Castle.

Arts journalist Véronique Prat sees the work's perspective, with the tower of Saint-Denys Basilica in a cloudy sky, as influenced by Hokusai.

Provenance 

The work is first recorded in the Parisian galleries of Georges Petit and Bernheim-Jeune, before being sold from the Paul Dognin collection on 15 October 1928 to Durand-Ruel, who sold it three days later to Morot. It later passed to Dora Fulford, who in 1945 left it to the National Art Collections Fund, which allocated it to its present owner later that year.

References

Paintings by Alfred Sisley
1872 paintings
Paintings in the East of England
Horses in art